Walter Edward "Buck" Neville was a college football player.

College football
"Buck" was a prominent fullback for the Georgia Bulldogs of the University of Georgia, selected All-Southern in his first year on the varsity. One accounts reads "It was Neville, though, that drew the focus from the 2,000 spectators present. That he is the best fullback in the South and the best Georgia has had since the days of Hatton Lovejoy was easily demonstrated by yesterday's game."

References

All-Southern college football players
American football fullbacks
Georgia Bulldogs football players